The 2023 New South Wales state election will be held on 25 March 2023 to elect the 58th Parliament of New South Wales, including all 93 seats in the Legislative Assembly and 21 of the 42 seats in the Legislative Council. The election will be conducted by the New South Wales Electoral Commission (NSWEC).

The incumbent minority Liberal/National Coalition government, led by Premier Dominic Perrottet, is seeking to win a fourth successive four-year term in office. They will be challenged by the Labor Party, led by Opposition Leader Chris Minns. The Greens, the Shooters, Fishers and Farmers Party, other minor parties and several independents will also contest the election.

New South Wales has compulsory voting, with optional preferential, instant runoff voting in single-member seats for the lower house, and single transferable voting with optional preferential above-the-line voting in the proportionally represented upper house.

The online voting system iVote will not be in place in this election. The NSW Government suspended iVote after the 2021 NSW Council elections saw 5 wards impacted by access outages, with three significant enough that analysis suggested as high as a 60% chance the wrong candidate had been elected, after which the NSW Supreme Court ordered those elections voided and re-run.

Background

Previous election

At the 2019 election, the Coalition won a third term in government for the first time since 1971 while Gladys Berejiklian became the first woman in New South Wales to lead a party to a state election victory. The Liberals won 35 seats while the Nationals won 13 seats, thus giving the Coalition a combined total of 48 seats, one more than the minimum 47 required for a majority.

The Labor Party won 36 seats and overtook the Liberals to become the largest single party in the Legislative Assembly. However, the party only managed to gain two seats from the Coalition, Coogee and Lismore.

The Greens strengthened their hold on the three seats they held prior to the election while the Shooters, Fishers and Farmers held onto Orange, a seat the party had won from the Nationals at a by-election, while also taking Barwon and Murray from the Nationals.

Independents Greg Piper and Alex Greenwich both retained the seats of Lake Macquarie and Sydney, respectively, while Joe McGirr successfully held on to the seat of Wagga Wagga he won in a by-election.

Change of premiership, resignations and minority government

Internal splits within the government became apparent in August and September 2020, when proposed laws protecting the habitats of koalas resulted in Nationals leader John Barilaro threatening to refuse to support government legislation and sit on the crossbench, while still holding ministerial positions. Berejiklian threatened to sack all Nationals ministers if they did not abandon their plan by 11 September 2020. Following a meeting between the Premier and Deputy Premier in the morning of 11 September, the Nationals backed down on their decision to move to the crossbench.

On 1 October 2021, Berejiklian resigned as Premier following the launch of an Independent Commission Against Corruption (ICAC) investigation into her having possibly breached public trust or encouraged corrupt behaviour during her personal relationship with the former member for Wagga Wagga, Daryl Maguire. At a subsequent Liberal party room meeting, Liberal deputy leader and New South Wales Treasurer Dominic Perrottet was chosen as her successor. Findings about the case are unlikely to be released prior to the election.

The government initially held a two-seat majority, which was technically only a one-seat majority with the omission of Liberal member Jonathan O'Dea as Speaker, who only has a casting vote. In May 2021 the government lost its majority on the floor of the parliament as Minister for Families, Communities and Disability Services Gareth Ward resigned from the ministry and moved to the crossbench after identifying himself as being the subject of an inquiry by the New South Wales Police Force's sex crimes and child abuse squad, for which he was later charged with offences. Ward denied the allegations, though in March 2022 he was suspended from the parliament, which remains in effect until the conclusion of the criminal proceedings. Less than two months prior to Ward's resignation from the ministry, Liberal member for Drummoyne John Sidoti also moved to the crossbench to sit as an independent, after ICAC announced it would open an inquiry into his personal property dealings. Both Sidoti and Ward's resignations meant the government was officially in minority status. This status was further cemented in February 2022, when the Liberals lost the seat of Bega at a by-election to the Labor Party, causing the Coalition to slip to 45 seats in the 93-seat Assembly. In March 2022 a bill moved by the Greens, to change the state's constitution and allow MPs to meet virtually during a declared emergency such as a pandemic, passed the parliament and in so doing, became the first non-government bill opposed by the government to pass the parliament since the Liberal/National Coalition came to power at the 2011 state election. The following month the Opposition Leader Chris Minns stated the Labor Party would not move or support a motion of no confidence against the government or seek to deny it supply, indicating the government will be able to serve the full term and avoid a snap election.  The success of the teal independents at the 2022 federal election has prompted concern from Tim James and Matt Kean.

On 29 March 2022, the Supreme Court of NSW dissolved the Christian Democratic Party. The race will be the first NSW state election since 1981 at which the Christian Democratic Party ("Call to Australia" prior to 1998) will not be contesting.

On 17 January 2023, Labor MP Tania Mihailuk announced that she was leaving the Australian Labor Party and would be running second on the One Nation ticket in the election for the Legislative Council, behind party leader Mark Latham.

Nazi uniform scandal 
On 12 January 2023, Premier Dominic Perrottet revealed that he had worn a Nazi uniform as fancy dress at his 21st birthday, apologising at a media conference after a cabinet minister was made aware of the incident. This announcement received extensive media coverage. Despite the scandal, Perrottet received the support of his ministerial colleagues, and Labor leader Chris Minns chose not to call for Perrottet's resignation. Robert Borsak, the leader of the  Shooters, Fishers and Farmers Party, publicly threatened to refer Perrottet to police over the incident.

From a poll that followed the Nazi uniform scandal, 67% said it didn't make a difference to their vote, 20% said it would make them less likely to vote for the Coalition and 8% said the scandal would make them more likely to vote for the Coalition.

Possibility of a hung parliament
It has widely been predicted that the election will lead to a hung parliament, meaning that crossbenchers must give confidence and supply to a party. The Greens are almost certain to side with Labor, while the three ex-Shooters, Fishers and Farmers party independents would likely side with the Coalition. Three other independents (Alex Greenwich, Greg Piper and Joe McGirr) currently give confidence and supply to the Coalition, but it is unclear whether or not they will continue this agreement.

Date
The parliament has fixed four-year terms with the election held on the fourth Saturday in March, though the Governor may dissolve the house sooner on the advice of the Premier.

Campaign events
On 5 March 2023, NSW Labor Party had their official campaign launch.

On 9 March a significant outage of the Sydney rail network caused by a communications failure required Premier Perrottet to apologise to customers and to have to offer a fare-free day.

On 11 March, The Greens NSW had their campaign launch, where they listed their balance of power objectives.

On 12 March the Liberal Party had their official campaign launch.

On 14 March confidential documents from KPMG and Clayton Utz consultants regarding the privatisation of Sydney Water were made public. Perrottet, who was the Treasurer at the time had previously declared in March 2020 that he had no plans to even do a study on privatisation, but the documents revealed that studies had taken place in January 2020 and later in November 2021, with the reporting making it clear the study was done due to direct pressure from the Government. The issue was widely discussed in Sydney newspapers and on right-wing talkback radio where commentators slammed the potential privatisation and declared that Perrottet was lying about his "lack of plans" to privatise Sydney Water.

The NSW Labor Party is giving preferences to the Shooters, Fishers and Farmers Party to counter One Nation in some seats.

Leaders' debates
The first leaders' debate was held on Thursday, 9 February 2023 on 2GB. Perrottet was declared the winner, with the support 65% of voters in an online poll following the debate.

A Channel 9 leaders debate between Labor and Liberal leaders was held on 15 March 2023.

A Sky News Australia leaders debate will be held on 22 March 2023.

Redistribution

The 2015 and 2019 elections were conducted using boundaries set in 2013. The state constitution requires the Electoral Commission to review electoral district boundaries after every two elections, to ensure that the number of voters in each district is within 10 per cent of the "quotient" – the number of voters divided by the number of Legislative Assembly seats. In 2020, the Commission began work on determining new boundaries for the 2023 election, a process commonly known as "redistribution". The projected population quotient in 2023 was 59,244, meaning that each district needed to have between 53,319 and 65,168 enrolled electors.

In November 2020, the proposed redistribution names and boundaries was released to the public for submission. All proposed abolished, created or renamed districts are within Sydney. In August 2021, the final determinations were gazetted.

The Labor-held district of Lakemba will be abolished and largely replaced by the adjacent Bankstown. A new district of Leppington in south-west Sydney will be created from Camden and Macquarie Fields.

A number of Liberal-held districts will be renamed, to reflect the population centre in the districts’ new boundaries:
 Mulgoa – to be renamed Badgerys Creek
 Baulkham Hills – to be renamed Kellyville
 Ku-ring-gai – to be renamed Wahroonga
 Seven Hills – to be renamed Winston Hills

The Liberal-held Heathcote will take in parts of the Illawarra from the Labor-held Keira and become a notionally marginal Labor seat.

Registered parties

Fifteen parties are registered with the New South Wales Electoral Commission (NSWEC). Bold text indicates parliamentary parties.

 Animal Justice Party
 Australian Labor Party
 Elizabeth Farrelly Independents
 The Greens NSW
 Informed Medical Options Party

 Legalise Cannabis NSW
 Liberal Democratic Party
 Liberal Party of Australia
 National Party of Australia
 Pauline Hanson's One Nation

 Public Education Party
 Shooters, Fishers and Farmers Party
 Small Business Party
 Socialist Alliance
 Sustainable Australia

Electoral pendulum

This is an excerpt of the pre-election pendulum, based on notional margins calculated by the ABC's Antony Green. Members in italics will not contest the election as a candidate for the seat they currently hold or its replacement. By-elections were held in some seats during this term of Parliament that changed their margins. See the footnotes for details.

Notes

Candidates and retiring MPs

Labor

Liberal

Nationals

Independent

Other

Polling

Voting intention

Primary vote

Two-party preferred

Opinion polls

Preferred Premier and satisfaction

Graphical summary

Polling

Electorate polling

See also 
 Candidates of the 2023 New South Wales state election

References

Elections in New South Wales
March 2023 events in Australia
New South Wales Legislative Council
New South Wales
2020s in New South Wales